Ekkaphong Jongkesakorn   (born January 30, 1983), is a Thai model, actor and engineer.

Early life and education 
Ekkaphong Jongkesakorn was born on January 30, 1983, at Uthai Thani Province. His father has a career as a supervisor, while his mother is a teacher. He graduated from secondary education from Nakhon Sawan School with Bachelor's degree from the Faculty of Engineering Chiang Mai University (Mechanical Engineering), and with Master's degree from the Faculty of Engineering Chulalongkorn University (Industrial Engineering) Academic Year 2010 with cumulative GPA of 3.81

Career 
Ekkaphong was discovered in Chiang Mai by P' A Supachai. P' A somehow got his number and had to call many times before they came to an agreement. P'A took photos for his profile and submitted it to Channel 3 . They then contacted him to sign a contract and he received his first drama. Wan Jai Gub Nai Jom Ying  with Chalida Vijitvongthong

Personal life 
Ekkaphong married to Karnsinee Suksai a girlfriend outside the entertainment industry. And the wife gave birth to a son named Nong Pam on 19 October 2018

Filmography

Television series

Mc 

  3 for you

References

External links 
 

1983 births
Living people
Ekkaphong Jongkesakorn
Ekkaphong Jongkesakorn
Ekkaphong Jongkesakorn
Ekkaphong Jongkesakorn
Ekkaphong Jongkesakorn
Ekkaphong Jongkesakorn
Ekkaphong Jongkesakorn